Aligudarz, also known as ‘Ali Gudār, is a city and capital of Aligudarz County, Lorestan Province, Iran. At the 2006 census, its population was 78,690, in 18,115 families.

Aligudarz is located 420 km from Tehran and situated in a region which is a mixture of plain and foothill, thus enjoying a mountainous mild climate. Oshtorankuh Mountain range and Aligudarz River are situated here.

Climate 
Aligudarz has a humid continental climate (Dsa).

Main sights
In the mountains and hills around Aligudarz, ancient objects have been discovered including rectangular brick earthenware from the thirteenth century AD.

Important natural and historical sites of Aligudarz include:
 Ab Sefid (literally "White Water") waterfall
 Aligudarz Forests
 Sayleh castle
 Tamandar and Bexnavid caves
 Masisilan Ancient Hill
 Mandish mountain
 Chakan Waterfall
 Shoul Abad landscapes

Notables from Aligudarz

 Mehdi Karroubi, politician
 Hamed Lak, football player
 Omid, singer

References

Towns and villages in Aligudarz County
Cities in Lorestan Province